Dust & Illusions is a 2009 documentary film about Burning Man and its founders. The film has been featured at several film festivals, and was shown at the San Francisco DocFest at The Roxie in San Francisco in October 2009. The film was written and directed by Olivier Bonin.

The film discusses the history of Burning Man, such as its 1970s counter-culture foundations, and its origins on Baker Beach in 1986. The film also documents its contemporary development. Dust & Illusions uses archival footage and interviews, such as with founder Larry Harvey.

References

External links
 
KBOO Portland Community Radio interview with Olivier Bonin
Cinesource Mag - Dust & Illusions at the San Francisco Film Festival
News & Review - Burning Man turns an engineer into a filmmaker 

2009 films
American documentary films
French documentary films
Documentary films about Burning Man
2009 documentary films
2000s English-language films
2000s American films
2000s French films